First Ink is a DVD featuring comedic digital shorts and a documentary about professional basketball player Chris Bosh. The comedic digital shorts segment, known as CBTV, features a collection of new digital shorts and characters. The new skits are coupled with "classic CBTV" skits, which earned Chris top ranking in ESPN's viral athletes rankings. The documentary segment follows Chris during his time off in the summer before his final season on contract with the Toronto Raptors. The film is approximately 30 minutes long and documents Chris' attempt to transform his body both by gaining weight and muscle and by getting a full back tattoo.

The DVD was released in Canada on December 15, 2009.

References

External links
 Bosh ready for his close-up: The Toronto Star
 

2009 films
English-language Canadian films
Canadian documentary films
Documentary films about basketball
2009 documentary films
2000s English-language films
2000s Canadian films